AFX / LFO is an untitled, split 12" record released by Richard D. James under his AFX moniker, along with LFO. This 12" was exclusive to Warpmart.com and was pressed in a limited edition of 2,000 copies. The record comes in a purple vinyl sleeve only, with no cardboard cover.

This record is meant to be played at 45rpm.

A song from each side of the record was featured on the soundtrack for the PlayStation Portable video game Wipeout Pure.

Track listing
AFX side
"46 Analord-Masplid" – 4:41
"Naks 11 [Mono]" – 2:56

LFO side
"Flu-Shot [Kringlan]" – 3:49
"Pathfinder" – 5:12

LFO (British band) albums
Aphex Twin EPs
2005 EPs
Split EPs